EJN may refer to:
 Earth Journalism Network
 Ejin Banner Taolai Airport, in Inner Mongolia, China
 Ethical Journalism Network
 European Judicial Network
European Journal of Neuroscience